"Brooklyn Bridge to Chorus" is a song by American rock band The Strokes. The song was released on April 6, 2020, as the third single from their sixth studio album, The New Abnormal (2020). The song was featured as part of the soundtrack to the sports video game MLB The Show 21.

Personnel
Adapted from The Strokes official YouTube channel.
Julian Casablancas – vocal, lyricist
Nikolai Fraiture –  bass guitar
Albert Hammond Jr. – guitar
Nick Valensi – guitar
Fabrizio Moretti – drums
Jason Lader – engineer, mixing engineer
Pete Min – engineer
Rob Bisel – assistant engineer
Dylan Neustadter – assistant engineer
Kevin Smith – assistant engineer
Stephen Marcussen – mastering engineer
Stewart Whitmore – mastering engineer
Rick Rubin – producer

Charts

References

External links

2020 singles
2020 songs
The Strokes songs
American new wave songs
Songs written by Julian Casablancas
Songs written by Nikolai Fraiture
Songs written by Fabrizio Moretti
Songs written by Nick Valensi
Songs written by Albert Hammond Jr.
Song recordings produced by Rick Rubin